State Route 823 (SR 823) is a  state highway in Lyon County, Nevada, United States. The road runs from State Route 208 near Wellington north to Simpson.

Major intersections

References

823
Transportation in Lyon County, Nevada